Phelan is an Irish surname, one of the two most common anglicisations (the other being Whelan) of the Irish surname Ó Faoláin (which comes from the Irish for "wolf"). The name is commonly seen in the south-east of Ireland, particularly counties Waterford and Kilkenny.  Other anglicised forms include, Felan and Faelan.

The O'Faelan (O'Harts spelling) clan name is claimed to have descended from Fiacha Suidhe, one of the younger brothers of Conn Ceadcathach or Conn of the Hundred Battles.  Fiacha Suidhe is said to have been expelled from Meath and after various wanderings was given permission to settle in lands around Waterford which were called the Desies.

This origin story, the Expulsion of the Deisi, is covered by Power which is believed to be a fictitious tale created by prominent families of the Desies to justify their elevation to Gaelic nobility from a former tributary status.

Early Medieval and Viking Era 
Keating speaks of Cellachán Caisil King of Munster plundering the town of Waterford causing its leader Sitiric to take flight.  After which, Cellachán gave his sister Gormfhlaith in marriage to Domhnall O Faolain, king of the Deise.

According to the Annals of the Four Masters, in 995, Donnavan son of Ivar and Domhnall son of Faelan, Lord of the Deisi killed Gillapatrick son of Donnchadh, lord of Osraighe. Donnoavan was killed in revenge for this deed a week later, Domhnall son of Faelan is later recorded as having died but the cause is unknown.

Keating also has Domhnall O Faolain, king of the Deise and Ivar of Waterford invading and plundering Munster.  Brian Bóruma then gave battle and defeated them at Fan mic Connrach, they were then chased to Waterford where Domhnall and most of the foreigners (Ostmen) were slain and the town was plundered and burned.  It is not clear when this is supposed to have happened or if this is the same Domhnall O Faolain reported in the Annals of the Four Masters as having died in 995.

Mothla Son of Domhnall son of Faelan, Lord of the Deisi-Mumhan was present at the Battle of Clontarf in 1014. This time an O Faelan is fighting alongside Brian against the combined forces of the King of Leinster and the Norse Gaels. The Cogadh Gaedhel Re Gallaibh places Mothla with Magnus King of the Ui Liathain at the head of Brian's second battalion, which is described as very great and strong and formed from the chosen hosts of all Munster.  Both the Annals and the Cogadh report Mothla's death at this battle along with Brian, his sons, the King of Leinster, many of the Norse Gael leaders and numerous others.

In, 1031 the annals record the death of Diarmaid, son of Domhnall, son of Faelan, lord of the Deisi, who was killed by Muircheartach, son of Brian, in the battle of Sliabh Cua.

In 1051, Muircheartach, son of Breac, (another noble family of the Deisi) lord of the Deisi, was burned by the Ua Faelains.

In 1059, another O'Breac, is killed by the Ua Faelain, on this occasion Maelseachlainn Ua Bric and Tomaltach Ua Maelbhrenainn, lord of Sil-Muireadhaigh were both smothered in a cave by Maelseachlainn, son of Gillabrighde, son of Faelan.

In 1067, in what appears to be an act of revenge, Maelseachlainn is blinded by the O'Breac having been delivered to them by Toirdhealbhach Ua Briain.

Later in 1168, Ua Faelain, lord of the Deisi-Mumhan along with Diarmaid Finn are recorded as killing a grandson of Conchobhar Ua Briain.  This grandson had slain Muircheartach Ua Briain, King of Munster, and royal heir of Ireland.  Finn and Ua Faelain are recorded as killing this grandson of Conchobhar Ua Briain as well as his co-conspirators in revenge.

Norman Period 

In 1170, O’Phelan Prince of the Desies, provided military assistance to the Ostmen of Waterford in an Irish/Ostmen coalition against the Norman adventurer Raymond FitzGerald who had landed at a sea cliff around 14 miles from Waterford with a small band of troops of around 100 men. The coalition was also joined by a group from Ossary and O’Ryan a chieftain of the Odrone.  Together they combined with the Vikings and the men of the Desies and formed three bands in which to confront Raymond.

Raymond is believed to have sallied forth against this force from a fortified position on the cliff but was overwhelmed and fled to his original position.  During this retreat forces from the coalition managed to get a foothold in Raymonds camp. A number of cattle which had previously been collected and kept inside the camp then stampeded the entrance where the attackers were gaining access.  This incident caused the Irish and Ostmen to fall into confusion and disarray and Raymond, rallying his men, turned the course of battle falling upon the coalition and turning a potential defeat into victory.  500 of the coalition are said to have been killed, some, being thrown from the cliffs.

Melaghlin O’Phelan, Prince of the Desies, was amongst the defenders of Waterford during Strongbow's (Richard de Clare) taking of the town in the summer of 1170.  On the 23rd of August, 1170, Strongbow with 200 knights and around 1000 other men landed in Waterford where he was joined by Raymond. Strongbow and Raymond assaulted Waterford and took the town after a breach was made in the walls.  Many citizens are said to have been killed, two Norse leaders of the town, both called Sitric, were executed.  A third Norse leader together with Melaghlin O’Phelan were spared due to the intervention of Diarmaid Mac Murchadha King of Leinster.

Melaghlin O’Phelan of the Desies is later found submitting to King Henry II in 1171 during King Henry's expedition to Ireland.

In 1196, the Annals of the Four Masters record the death of a son O'Faelain (Phelan), of the Desies who was part of a failed expedition into Ulster.   It appears that this son of O'Faelain was part of a coalition including Rory Mac Donslevy, the English, and chieftains of Connaught.  They marched their army against the Kinel-Owen and Oriors. The Kinel-Owen and the men of Orior gave them battle on a plain in Armagh where Mac Donslevy was defeated with dreadful slaughter with twelve of the sons of the lords and chieftains of Connaught slain, along with many of an inferior grade also slain including the son of O'Faelain of the Desies.

In 1205 the annals record the death of Donnell O'Faelain (Phelan), Lord of the Desies.

In 1208 the same annals record the death of David Breathnach (Walsh) the Bishop of Waterford who was slain by O'Faelan of the Desies.

List of persons with the surname
Adam Phelan (born 1991), Australian racing cyclist
Ann Phelan, Irish Labour Party politician
Anna Augusta Von Helmholtz-Phelan (1880-1964), US-American professor, author
Anne Phelan (1944–2019), Australian actress
Art Phelan (1887–1964), US-American baseball player
Chris Phelan, Australian rugby league footballer
Edward Phelan (1811–1850), US-American settler
Edward J. Phelan (1888–1967), Director-General of the United Nations International Labor Office
Gerard Phelan (contemporary), former college football player at Boston College
Jacquie Phelan (contemporary), US-American mountain biker
James Phelan (disambiguation), several people
Jo Phelan, American sociologist
John J. Phelan (1851–1936), American politician; Supreme Knight of the Knights of Columbus and Secretary of the State of Connecticut
John J. Phelan (1872–1946), American boxing commissioner and military officer who served as chairman of the New York State Athletic Commission and was a Major General in the New York Army National Guard.
John Paul Phelan (born 1978), member of the 22nd Seanad Éireann for Fine Gael
Kate Phelan (born 1964), British fashion journalist and stylist
Katelynn Phelan (born 2000), Irish boxer
Kevin Phelan (born 1990), Irish professional golfer
Kieran Phelan (born 1949), Irish politician and member of the Seanad Éireann for Fianna Fáil
L.A.M. Phelan, (fl. 1910–1955), US-American businessman and inventor, founded Broaster company
Lizzie Phelan (born Elizabeth Cocker, 1986), British journalist who uses her Irish grandmother's surname for her professional work
Margaret Phelan (1902–2000), president of the Kilkenny Archaeological Society
Michael L. Phelan (born 1947), Canadian judge of the Federal Court of Canada
Mike Phelan (born 1962), English footballer
Nancy Phelan (born 1913), Australian writer
Paddy Phelan (1910–1971), Irish hurler
Patricia Phelan (contemporary), Zen priestess
Patrick Phelan (disambiguation), several people
Paul Phelan (born 1966), Irish hurler
Ryan Phelan (born 1975), Australian television presenter
Richard Phelan (1825–1904), Roman Catholic bishop of Pittsburgh, Pennsylvania
Santiago Phelan (born 1974), Argentine rugby union player and coach
Scott Phelan (born 1988), English football player
Shawn Phelan (1975–1998), American actor
Simon Phelan (born 1986), Irish-Jèrriais high jumper
Ted Phelan (1874–1961), New Zealand trade unionist, politician and rugby league administrator
Terry Phelan (born 1967), Irish professional football player
Twist Phelan, American author and former attorney
Unity Phelan, American ballet dancer
Vicky Phelan (1974 – 2022), Irish healthcare campaigner
William Phelan, several people

Fictional characters
Andrea Phelan, correctional officer on the HBO television show Oz
Daniel Phelan, judge on the HBO television show The Wire
Eugenia "Skeeter" Phelan, one of the main characters in The Help by Kathryn Stockett
Francis Phelan, character in many of William Kennedy's Albany novels
Phelan, leader of the black market in a Season 2 episode of the re-imagined Battlestar Galactica
Sally Phelan, a minor character from the Doctor Who episode The Age of Steel
Sam Phelan, crooked cop from the first season of the television series Smallville
Pat Phelan, a main character from Coronation Street
Phelan of the Cantii, character from the tv show  Britannia (TV series)

See also

References

Anglicised Irish-language surnames